Dacryodes patentinervia is a tree in the family Burseraceae. It is endemic to Borneo, whereby it is known locally as sabal, sibut or seladah.

Names 
The species was mistakenly identified as Dacryodes expansa. It was also formerly classified as a subspecies of Dacryodes macrocarpa.

It is known as sabal in Brunei and by the Iban people, sibut by the Tutong and Dusun people in Brunei, and seladah in Sarawak.

Description 
The buttresses are narrow and the bark is thin, flaky and pale yellow-brown in colour. The male flower is trimerous.

Distribution and habitat 
Dacryodes patentinervia is endemic to northwest Borneo, from the Rejang valley in Sarawak to as far as Bukit Hampuan in Sabah. It grows most abundant in mixed dipterocarp forest.

Uses 
The fruit is regarded as a laxative.

References

Footnotes

Bibliography 
 

patentinervia
Endemic flora of Borneo
Trees of Borneo